Apafant (WEB-2086, LSM-2613) is a drug which acts as a potent and selective inhibitor of the phospholipid mediator platelet-activating factor (PAF). It was developed by structural modification of the thienotriazolodiazepine sedative drug brotizolam and demonstrated that PAF inhibitory actions could be separated from activity at the benzodiazepine receptor. Apafant was investigated for several applications involving inflammatory responses such as asthma and conjunctivitis but was never adopted for medical use, however it continues to be used in pharmacology research.

References 

Thienotriazolodiazepines
Chloroarenes
Morpholines
Amides